The Lyman limit is the short-wavelength end of the hydrogen Lyman series, at . It corresponds to the energy required for an electron in the hydrogen ground state to escape from the electric potential barrier that originally confined it, thus creating a hydrogen ion. This energy is equivalent to the Rydberg constant.

See also 
 Balmer Limit
 Lyman-alpha emitter
 Lyman-alpha forest
 Lyman-break galaxy
 Lyman series
 Rydberg formula

References

Atomic physics